Events from the year 1869 in Canada.

Incumbents

Crown 
 Monarch – Victoria

Federal government 
 Governor General – Charles Monck, 4th Viscount Monck (until February 2) then John Young, 1st Baron Lisgar 
 Prime Minister – John A. Macdonald
 Parliament – 1st

Provincial governments

Lieutenant governors     
Lieutenant Governor of New Brunswick – Lemuel Allan Wilmot 
Lieutenant Governor of Nova Scotia – Charles Hastings Doyle    
Lieutenant Governor of Ontario – William Pearce Howland    
Lieutenant Governor of Quebec – Narcisse-Fortunat Belleau

Premiers    
Premier of New Brunswick – Andrew Rainsford Wetmore    
Premier of Nova Scotia – William Annand 
Premier of Ontario – John Sandfield Macdonald     
Premier of Quebec – Pierre-Joseph-Olivier Chauveau

Events
February 2 – Lord Lisgar replaces Viscount Monck of Ballytrammon as Governor General
February 11 – Patrick James Whelan is hanged for the assassination of Thomas D'Arcy McGee
October 9 – Sir Francis Hincks becomes Minister of Finance
October 24 – The Canadian Illustrated News is founded in Montreal.
November 19 – The Deed of Surrender recognizes the purchase of Rupert's Land and the North-Western Territory from the Hudson's Bay Company: the lands are placed under the direct control of the Crown, but do not yet formally belong to Canada.

Full date unknown
Timothy Eaton opens his first store in Toronto
Newfoundland rejects Confederation with Canada
1869 Newfoundland general election
Red River Rebellion begins
George Hunt founds Huntsville, Ontario
1869 to 1870 – Smallpox epidemic strikes Canadian Plains tribes, including Blackfeet, Piegan, and Blood.
Maria Susan Rye began bringing groups of children from poorhouses and orphanages to Canada from England.

Sport 
November 3 – Hamilton Tigers Canadian football team is founded

Births

March 18 – Maude Abbott, physician (d.1940)
April 6 – Marc-Aurèle de Foy Suzor-Coté, painter and sculptor (d.1937)
June 20 – William Donald Ross, financier, banker and Lieutenant Governor of Ontario (d.1947)
August 25 – Charles William Jefferys, artist and historian (d.1951)
November 25 – Herbert Greenfield, politician and 4th Premier of Alberta (d.1949)
December 18 – William Sanford Evans, politician (d.1950)
December 30 – Stephen Leacock, writer and economist (d.1944)

Deaths

 February 11 – Patrick J. Whelan, tailor and alleged Fenian sympathizer executed following the 1868 assassination of Canadian journalist and politician Thomas D'Arcy McGee (b.1840)
 March 5 – John Redpath, Scots-Quebecer businessman and philanthropist (b.1796)
 August 1 – Louis-Charles Boucher de Niverville, lawyer and politician (b.1825)

Historical documents
Ottawa Board of Trade assesses the Northwest's commercial potential

Red River resident finds those who are opposed to the Metis provisional government are unwilling to resist it

Painting: Hudson's Bay Company canoes on Lake Superior

References
  

 
Canada
Years of the 19th century in Canada
1869 in North America